Erkan Sekman (born 17 April 1984 in Pütürge, Malatya Province) is a Turkish professional footballer who currently plays as a defender for Yeni Malatyaspor.

Club career
Sekman began his Beştelsiz in 1997. He moved to Doğan Güneşspor in 1999, and was transferred to Beşiktaş in 2001. He was promoted to the senior team in 2003. The club sent him on loan to Fatih Karagümrük for two straight seasons. He was →then transferred to Konyaspor in 2006. He has also played for Gaziantepspor (2008–2010) and Denizlispor (2010).

References

1984 births
Living people
People from Pütürge
Turkish footballers
Beşiktaş J.K. footballers
Fatih Karagümrük S.K. footballers
Konyaspor footballers
Gaziantepspor footballers
Denizlispor footballers
Antalyaspor footballers
Orduspor footballers
Süper Lig players
TFF First League players
Association football defenders